"In My Head" is a single released by the rock group Queens of the Stone Age on June 27, 2005, from their fourth album Lullabies to Paralyze.  The song originally featured as a track from The Desert Sessions, appearing on Volume 10: I Heart Disco in 2003 where it was named "In My Head...Or Something".

The version of the song on Lullabies to Paralyze first appeared in November 2004, on the soundtrack of the racing video game Need for Speed: Underground 2.  The song is available as downloadable content for Rock Band 3 and also appears in the end credits during the Entourage episode "The Release".

A music video for the song was released that was later castigated by guitarist Troy Van Leeuwen:

Track list
"In My Head" - 4:03
"I Think I Lost My Headache" (Live) - 5:57
"God Is in the Radio" (Live) - 7:53

Personnel 
The Desert Sessions – Volume 10: I Heart Disco
Josh Homme – lead vocals, drums
Josh Freese – bass
Troy Van Leeuwen – guitar
Alain Johannes – guitar
Dean Ween – piano

Queens of the Stone Age – Lullabies to Paralyze
Josh Homme – lead vocals, bass
Joey Castillo – drums, piano, percussion
Troy Van Leeuwen – lead guitar, backing vocals
Alain Johannes – rhythm guitar

Charts

References

External links
 Song lyrics on thefade.net

Queens of the Stone Age songs
2005 singles
Songs written by Josh Homme
Songs written by Josh Freese
Songs written by Joey Castillo
Songs written by Troy Van Leeuwen
2005 songs
2003 songs
Interscope Records singles